Dover Gardens is a suburb of Adelaide, South Australia, in the City of Marion.

History 

Settlement of the area dates from the mid-1800s, with land used mainly for farming, orchards and vineyards. Some growth took place from the late 1800s into the 1920s. Substantial development did not occur until after the Second World War, with rapid growth during the 1950s and 1960s. The population fluctuated slightly between 1991 and 2006, due to small changes in dwelling stock and the average number of persons living in each dwelling. The population increased between 2006 and 2011 as new dwellings were added to the area, particularly medium density housing.

Points of interest 
Points of interest include Pattriti Winery, Branksome Terrace Reserve, McKay Street Reserve and Scarborough Terrace Reserve.

See also
List of Adelaide suburbs

References

Suburbs of Adelaide